The Argentina International is an open badminton tournament held in Argentina. The tournament has been a Pan American Badminton Circuit Future level event from 1997 till 2000. In 2012-2013, this tournament has been a BWF Future Series level by the Badminton World Federation, and since 2014, upgraded to BWF International Series with the total prize money $5,000. Badminton in Argentina began to be played in private residences, clubs and schools of foreign origin, and in 1982, the national federation, Federación de Bádminton de la República Argentina (FEBARA) is founded. In 1993, the FEBARA join the International Badminton Federation, Argentine Olympic Committee (COA), and Confederación Argentina de Deportes (CAD), and at that year, the federation started to host the national tournament which was held at CeNARD, with more than 100 players from all over the country compete. In 1997, FEBARA organized the first international tournament with the sanctioned from the Badminton Pan Am.

Previous Winners

Performances by nation

References

External links
 Federación de Bádminton de la República Argentina 

Badminton tournaments in Argentina
Recurring sporting events established in 1997